Stage to Blue River is a 1951 American Western film directed by Lewis D. Collins and written by Joseph F. Poland. The film stars Whip Wilson, Fuzzy Knight, Phyllis Coates, Lee Roberts, Terry Frost and Lane Bradford. The film was released on December 30, 1951, by Monogram Pictures.

Plot

Cast          
Whip Wilson as Whip Wilson
Fuzzy Knight as Texas
Phyllis Coates as Joyce Westbrook
Lee Roberts as Ted Crosby
Terry Frost as Yarrow
Lane Bradford as Tom Reardon
John Hart as Frederick Kingsley
Pierce Lyden as Sheriff Bill Preston
Boyd Stockman as Henchman

References

External links
 

1951 films
1950s English-language films
American Western (genre) films
1951 Western (genre) films
Monogram Pictures films
Films directed by Lewis D. Collins
Films scored by Raoul Kraushaar
American black-and-white films
Films with screenplays by Joseph F. Poland
1950s American films